Herself is a 2020 drama film directed by Phyllida Lloyd, from a screenplay by Malcolm Campbell and Clare Dunne. The film stars Dunne, Harriet Walter and Conleth Hill.

Herself had its world premiere at the Sundance Film Festival on 24 January 2020 and was released in the United States in a limited release on 30 December 2020, followed by digital streaming on Amazon Prime Video on 8 January 2021 by Amazon Studios.

Premise
Single mother Sandra (Clare Dunne) has been struggling to get by with her two young daughters after leaving her abusive husband. After the housing system refuses to give her a new home, Sandra decides to build her own with the help of a friendly community and a handful of new friends. With this new purpose, Sandra rediscovers herself: that is until her abusive former husband sues her for custody of the children.

Cast
 Clare Dunne as Sandra
 Harriet Walter as Peggy
 Conleth Hill as Aido
 Molly McCann as Molly
 Ruby Rose O'Hara as Emma
 Cathy Belton as Jo
 Rebecca O'Mara as Grainne
 Ericka Roe as Amy
 Ian Lloyd Anderson as Gary
 Sean Duggan as Ciaran Crowley
 Aaron Lockhart as Tomo
 Anita Petry as Rosa
 Dmitry Vinokurov as Dariusz

Production
In March 2019, it was announced Phyllida Lloyd would direct the film, from a screenplay by Malcolm Campbell and Clare Dunne, and that Dunne would also star in the film. In April 2019, Conleth Hill and Harriet Walter joined the cast of the film.

Release
It had its world premiere at the Sundance Film Festival on 24 January 2020. Shortly after, Amazon Studios acquired U.S. distribution rights to the film. It was released in the United States in a limited release on 30 December 2020, followed by digital streaming on Amazon Prime Video on 8 January 2021.

Reception 
The website's critics consensus reads: "Sensitively directed by Phyllida Lloyd and brought to life by co-writer Clare Dunne's stunning performance, Herself charts one woman's journey with empathy and grace." Metacritic reports a score of 71 out of 100, based on 19 critic reviews, indicating "generally favorable reviews".

Notes

References

External links
 

2020 films
2020 drama films
2020s British films
2020s English-language films
Amazon Studios films
BBC Film films
British courtroom films
British drama films
English-language Irish films
Films about child abuse
Films about divorce
Films about domestic violence
Films about dysfunctional families
Films about poverty in the United Kingdom
Films directed by Phyllida Lloyd
Films scored by Natalie Holt
Irish drama films